Albert Anderson "Jumbo" Jacks (born c. 1935) is a retired American professor and college football coach. He played as a quarterback at Penn State University from 1956 to 1958. Jacks spent 19 years as the head football coach at Clarion State College from 1963 to 1981. He very briefly held the same position at Williams College. Jacks is the winningest Clarion football coach by winning percentage. He was also an associate professor of health and physical education at Clarion from 1963 to 1996.

Early life
Jacks attended Peabody High School in Pittsburgh. He went to college at Pennsylvania State University, where he played on the football team as a quarterback from 1956 to 1958 under head coach Rip Engle.<ref>All-Time Lettermen (PDF), 2009 Penn State Football Media Guide, p. 194, Pennsylvania State University, 2009.</ref> He received Bachelor of Science and Master of Science degrees in health and education from Penn State.

Coaching career
Clarion State College (now Clarion University of Pennsylvania) hired Jacks as its head coach for the 1964 season. He led the team to a 10–0 record in 1966 and won the Pennsylvania state championship. Jacks later credited that season with increasing the program's credibility in recruiting circles. While coaching at Clarion, Jacks took courses at Penn State, the University of Michigan, and Slippery Rock University of Pennsylvania.

In January 1971, Jacks accepted the head coaching job at Williams College, but held the position for only five days. He later said, "There was a whole different atmosphere, they didn't approach football the way we did [at Clarion] ... There have been other jobs I looked into, but none were better than I had here." Jack returned to Clarion for the following season. Sports Illustrated'' stated Jacks "face[d] his biggest rebuilding task in 18 years as coach" in 1980, but that season, he led the team to the Pennsylvania Conference championship. For the performance, the Eastern College Athletic Conference (ECAC) named it the Team of the Year.

In 1981, Jacks stepped down as head coach, but remained on the staff as an assistant coach to Charley Ruslavage, his own former assistant, and an associate professor at the school. He cited time spent away from his family and the demands of the job. At the time of his resignation at the age of 46, he had 18 consecutive winning seasons. During his tenure, Clarion amassed a 128–46–5 record, three Pennsylvania Conference championships, and six Pennsylvania Conference Western Division championships. By winning percentage, Jacks is the most successful Clarion football coach in school history at .729. He held the position of chairman of health and physical education department until retiring in 1996.

Personal life
Jacks and his wife Karen had three sons. Clarion University of Pennsylvania established the Al & Karen Jacks Football Scholarship in honor of Jacks and his late wife and to provide scholarships to eligible athletes. He was inducted into the  Clarion University Sports Hall of Fame in the inaugural 1989 class.

References

1930s births
Living people
Sportspeople from Pittsburgh
Penn State Nittany Lions football players
American football quarterbacks
Clarion Golden Eagles football coaches
Williams Ephs football coaches
Slippery Rock University of Pennsylvania alumni
University of Michigan alumni
Players of American football from Pittsburgh
Educators from Pennsylvania